This is a list of launches made by the Long March rocket family between 1980 and 1989.

Launch statistics

Rocket configurations

Launch outcomes

Launch history

1980–1984

|}

1985–1989

|}

Sources 

 
 
 

Space program of the People's Republic of China
Long March